This is the calendar for any Old Style leap year starting on Wednesday, 25 March. The Old Style calendar ended the following March, on 24 March. Examples: Julian year 1556, 1668 or 1724 (see bottom tables).

A leap year is a year with 366 days, as compared to a common year, which has 365.

 Previous year (common)   Next year (common)
 Previous year (leap)     Next year (leap)

References

Old Style leap years
Julian calendar